Guillaume IX d’Hugues  (died 27 October 1648) was archbishop of Embrun from November 16, 1612 - October 27, 1648 and a diplomat for the French King.

Guillaume IX d’Hugues, third son of Michel and Delphine du Pré, was born in Pouzols in the diocese of Béziers. He entered very young to the Friars Minor Conventual, and was a professor till he was about 37 years. King Henry IV of France undertook the business of France in various courts of Italy, Germany and England and Marie de' Medici, as his regent, appointed Guillaume to the archbishopric of Embrun in 1612. He went to Spain accompanying Elisabeth of France, to marry Philip IV, and led to England, Henriette de France, to marry the future Charles I of England after negotiating these marriages. He built several remarkable monuments in Embrun and died in his diocese October 27, 1648.

References

 

17th-century Roman Catholic archbishops in France
Bishops of Embrun
1648 deaths